Kentucky Route 620 (KY 620) is a  state highway in Scott County that runs from U.S. Route 62 (US 62) in far northwestern Georgetown adjacent to Toyota Motor Manufacturing Kentucky to U.S. Route 25 (US 25) and Harbor Village Drive west of Rogers Gap via Delaplain, Biddle, Double Culvert, Turkey Foot, and Rogers Gap. The road ended at KY 3487 and Delaplain Road until August 5, 2021, when the road was extended along the entire length of KY 3487 to US 62.

Major intersections

References

0620
Transportation in Scott County, Kentucky
Georgetown, Kentucky